The 2011 Challenger Banque Nationale de Saguenay was a professional tennis tournament played on indoor hard courts. It was the 6th edition of the tournament and part of the 2011 ITF Women's Circuit, offering a total of $50,000 in prize money. It took place in Saguenay, Quebec, Canada between October 24 and October 30, 2011.

Singles main-draw entrants

Seeds

1 Rankings are as of October 17, 2011

Other entrants
The following players received wildcards into the singles main draw:
 Elisabeth Abanda
 Charlotte Petrick
 Erin Routliffe
 Kimberley-Ann Surin

The following players received entry from the qualifying draw:
 Emily J. Harman
 Viktoryia Kisialeva
 Diana Ospina
 Sun Shengnan

The following player received entry as a lucky loser:
 Līga Dekmeijere

Champions

Singles

 Tímea Babos def.  Julia Boserup, 7–6(9–7), 6–3

Doubles

 Tímea Babos /  Jessica Pegula def.  Gabriela Dabrowski /  Marie-Ève Pelletier, 6–4, 6–3

External links
Official website

Challenger Banque Nationale de Saguenay
Challenger de Saguenay
Challenger Banque Nationale de Saguenay